The Shan Hills (Shan Yoma), also known as Shan Highland, is a vast mountainous zone that extends through Yunnan to Myanmar and Thailand. The whole region is made up of numerous peaks separated mostly by narrow valleys, as well as a few broader intermontane basins. The ranges in the area are aligned in such a way that they link to the foothills of the Himalayas further to the northwest.

Other peaks are the  Mong Ling Shan,   Doi Inthanon and  m Loi Pangnao. All are ultra prominent peaks of Southeast Asia.

Etymology
The name of the massif or system of ranges, is derived from the Shan State and its peoples, said in its turn to be derived from the word "Siam", that occupies most of the Shan Highland area.

Since it was relatively unexplored until recent times, the Shan mountainous region was referred to as the "Shan Plateau" in geographic works of the British colonial period, a name that is still sometimes used. However, since the whole area lacks the expanses of relatively flat high terrain which are the main characteristic of a plateau, this label is rather incongruous.

Geology
Geologically in the Shan Hills and their southern subranges, layers of alluvium are superimposed on hard rock. Karstic ranges are common, for large tracts of the hills are limestone. The Shan Hills are an important silver and ruby mining area.

Geography
The area of the Shan Highland is a combination of hill ranges, steep river valleys and a few elevated plains. The area is the primary source of Myanmar's sapphires, rubies and other gems, for which the country is known; it is also a principal source of lead, silver and zinc.

The Shan Hills straddle central eastern Myanmar and northwestern Thailand. They rise steeply from Myanmar's central plain and stretch for hundreds of kilometres eastwards into Thailand's northwest. The surface of the system is cut across by steep river gorges, part of the drainage basins of the Chao Phraya, the Irrawaddy, the Sittaung and the Salween or Thanlwin River which cuts across the plateau in a north-south direction.

Subranges
Daen Lao Range. The Daen Lao Range (ทิวเขาแดนลาว) or 'Loi La Range' is in the southern and southeastern area of the Shan Hills. It separates the Salween watershed from the Mekong watershed. The Daen Lao subrange includes Doi Nang Non (The Sleeping Lady), a karstic formation at its southern end with waterfalls and caves.

Karen Hills. The west end of the Shan Hills system is not clearly defined, with the Karen Hills in the southwestern area of the system beyond the Salween. Geographically the Karen Hills are the southwestern projection of the Shan Hills. They are also referred to as "Kayah-Karen Mountains".

Thanon Thong Chai Range. The Thanon Thong Chai Range (เทือกเขาถนนธงชัย) is the southernmost prolongation of the Shan Highland system. Doi Inthanon, the highest point in Thailand, reaching , is part of the Inthanon Range (ทิวเขาอินทนนท์), a high ridge of the Thanon Thong Chai subrange located in Chiang Mai Province. Some geographers include the Thanon Thong Chai Range subsystem as part of the Daen Lao Range.

History
In British colonial times, the main hill station in Burma, Pyin Oo Lwin known in English as Maymyo, was built in the western region of the Shan Hills. Pyin Oo Lwin is still known for its botanical gardens and, like all British hill stations, has samples of colonial architecture. Presently Inle Lake near Yawnghwe is one of the tourist attractions of the Shan highlands.

The Taunggyi Bird Sanctuary, established in 1906 as the Taunggyi Wildlife Reserve was redesignated as a bird sanctuary in 1989.

Owing to the insurgency and the activity of the Tatmadaw in the area many local people living in the mountainous areas of the Shan Hills moved across the border to Thailand where they live in refugee camps.

Despite the ongoing insurgency, the Shan Hills grows most of Myanmar's potatoes.

On 24 March 2011, a magnitude 6.8 earthquake struck in Tarlay, Tachileik Township, in the Daen Lao range area on the eastern part of the hill system. It killed more than 70 and injured more than 100 people. Three hundred-ninety houses, 14 Buddhist monasteries and nine government buildings were damaged.

Features

See also
List of Ultras of Southeast Asia
Doi Inthanon
Zomia (geography)

References

External links

The Geology of Burma (Myanmar)
Peakbagger - Shan-Western Thailand

 
Mountain ranges of Myanmar
Mountain ranges of Thailand
Hills of Myanmar